

The Falconar Teal was a two-seat homebuilt, amphibious airplane designed by Chris Falconar of Edmonton, Alberta, Canada. From the 1970s to the 1990s plans were sold by Falconar Aviation of Edmonton (downtown municipal airport). A handful were built by amateur aircraft constructors (aka homebuilders) in Canada and the United States. Most were powered by certified Lycoming or Continental engines.

Design and development
The Teal was based on the two- or three-seat AMF Maranda, and was built mostly of wood. It featured strut-braced high wing, with "W" configuration struts running from the wing roots, down to stabilizing floats (which also contained the main wheels), then back up the wings near 70% span; cruciform tail; two pilots seated side by side under the wing; access to the cockpit by side doors; tricycle undercarriage with the main wheels retracting into stabilizing floats only about 25% of the wing span. The nosewheel retracted into the bow and was covered by two conventional (side-hinged) doors. A rarity among flying boats was its engine location in a nacelle, above the wing, with the propeller rotating immediately in front of the windscreen.

Specifications

References

External links
 Plan vendor's website 

1960s Canadian civil utility aircraft
Flying boats
Homebuilt aircraft
Single-engined tractor aircraft
High-wing aircraft
Amphibious aircraft
Teal
Aircraft first flown in 1967